Philip Spencer Trusttum  (born 9 June 1940) is a leading New Zealand figurative expressionist artist. His works are usually large-scale, energetic, and colourful works on unstretched canvas.

Trusttum was born in Raetihi, in the central North Island, in 1940 to William and Katherine Trusttum. His father was a Methodist lay preacher, but he became disillusioned with his religious work and in 1945 the Trusttum family left for Christchurch, where Philip attended Waimairi School. The family moved to Oxford in 1948, and again to Rangiora in 1955 and to nearby Ashley in 1957.

Philip Trusttum's interest in art was kindled in Oxford, but did not seriously study the subject until he was 20, at which time he was accepted into the University of Canterbury School of Fine Arts. Here, he was taught by Rudolf Gopas, who was to prove a strong influence on the young artist, and through him became interested in expressionism. He was also to become a member of The Group an influential group of Canterbury artists whose members included Colin McCahon, Toss Woollaston, and Doris Lusk. Trusttum graduated with a Diploma in Fine Arts in 1965.

In 1967, Trusttum was awarded a Queen Elizabeth II Arts Council scholarship for travel to develop his practice, though his initial overseas trip, to Australia, was met with disaster when many of his finished canvases were damaged in transit. Since then his travels have taken him to both North America and Europe.

Since the early 1970s Trusttum's work has largely been inspired by everyday life experiences often worked into a semi-abstract form. His subject matter has ranged from house renovation to tennis, horses to Japanese masks. In 1984, Trusttum participated in ANZART at the Edinburgh Arts Festival. He has shown in Sydney, New York, and Melbourne, as well as in all New Zealand's main centres. In 2000 he became only the second New Zealand artist to be awarded the prestigious Pollock Krasner Foundation grant.

In the 2021 Queen's Birthday Honours, Trusttum was appointed an Officer of the New Zealand Order of Merit, for services to art.

Notes

References

External links
Trusttum's website

1940 births
Living people
New Zealand painters
People from Raetihi
People from Christchurch
Officers of the New Zealand Order of Merit
People associated with The Group (New Zealand art)